Beistegui is a surname. Notable people with the surname include:

 Carlos de Beistegui (1895–1970), eccentric Spanish-French multi-millionaire
 Miguel de Beistegui (born 1966), Professor of Philosophy at the University of Warwick

See also 
 Beistegui Hermanos, a Spanish bicycle manufacturer